Chilorhinus is a small  genus of eels of the family Chlopsidae that occurs in tropical waters.  It contains these two described species:

 C. platyrhynchus (Norman, 1922) (flatnose xenocongrid eel)
 C. suensonii Lütken, 1852 (seagrass eel)

References

Eels
Chlopsidae
Taxa described in 1852